Hirtudiscus boyacensis is a species of land snail in the subfamily of Scolodontinae of the family Scolodontidae, first described by Bernhard Hausdorf in 2003.


Etymology and habitat 
Hirtudiscus boyacensis has been named after the Colombian department Boyacá where the species has been found. The holotype was discovered in a dry forest at  altitude between Villa de Leyva and Gachantivá.

Description 
The morphology of Hirtudiscus boyacensis is described by Hausdorf; a disc-like shell with convex whorls, a protoconch with more or less distinct spiral striae and dense growth striae and hairs. The shell diameter is 3.5-5.2 mm.

The specimens from the surroundings of Barbosa and Moniquira differ from those from near Villa de Leyva in the smaller shell with more strongly arched whorls, a weaker spiral sculpture on the protoconch and an umbilicus that is on average narrower.

References

Bibliography 
 

Scolodontidae
Altiplano Cundiboyacense
Boyacensis
Endemic fauna of Colombia
Invertebrates of Colombia
Molluscs of South America
Gastropods described in 2003